Miletus symethus, the great brownie, is a small butterfly found in India that belongs to the lycaenids or blues family. The species was first described by Pieter Cramer in 1777.

Range
It is found in the Naga Hills in India, Myanmar, Malaya, Sumatra and the Philippines.

Status
The species is considered very rare.

Description
A small butterfly, 40 to 50 mm in wingspan, it is the largest of the genus. The upper forewing in both sexes has a broad white discal band which extends right up to dorsum, the upper edge of which is sharply angled at vein 3. The upper hindwing has a pale discal streak.

Technical description

The male has the upperside of wings dusky brownish black. The ground colour of the forewings darker, almost pure black in fresh specimens, on the apical third of the wing; a short streak in the middle of interspace 1, a more outwardly produced similar streak in interspace 2, basal halves of interspaces 3 and 4, the lower apex of the discoidal cell and the extreme base of interspace 5, white, all forming a median conspicuous irregular white patch on the wing, narrowly traversed by the veins which are greyish brown. Hindwing: more uniform, slightly darker on its anterior half. Underside: light brown with an ochraceous tint. Forewing: the median white patch as on the upperside but larger, its margins less clearly defined, continued posteriorly to the dorsal margin; obscure catenulated (in the form of a chain), incomplete, transverse, white-margined narrow bands, two at base and two or three very short ones above the white median patch on the costal area, from between the outer two of these latter a transverse, zigzag, very slender, somewhat obscure white line crosses the anterior portion of the wing to vein 4; lastly a pre-tornal quadrate brown spot near apex of interspace 1a and an obscure sub-terminal transverse series of slightly lunular small brown spots; the ground colour terminally paler and more ochraceous than on the inner portions of the wing. Hindwing: crossed by very obscure sinuous brown and white slender lines, that on the costal area form very short, obsolescent, catenulated narrow brown bands; a subterminal series of brown slender lunules, sometimes obsolete. Antennae, head, thorax and abdomen brown; beneath: paler, the palpi and thorax more or less white.

The female has the upperside forewings of dark brown; base shaded with greyish brown; the white median patch as in the male, but very much larger, its upper margin irregularly curved; it is spread over the anterior two-thirds of the cell, extends beyond it into the bases of interspaces 4, 5 and 6, and below the cell it occupies the basal four-fifths of interspaces 1 and 2. Hindwing: costal margin broadly dark brownish; wing posteriorly from below the subcostal vein and vein 6a beautiful pale bluish-grey; a broad whitish streak beyond the cell not reaching the termen. Underside, forewing: the median white patch as on the upperside but larger, extending to the dorsal margin and base of cell; base of wing, costal margin above the sub-costal vein and conjoined upper discal obliquely-placed patch greyish brown; apex of wing whitish, termen between veins 1 and 6 broadly stained with rusty; a conspicuous rusty pretornal spot; some obscure white-margined spots at base of cell and along costa, and a transverse sub-terminal series of black dots. Hindwing: pale ochraceous white, darkening to rusty brown towards the middle of the termen; a subbasal, a median and a discal transverse incomplete macular brown band, each spot in the bands margined on the inner and outer sides by slender black lines; finally a subterminal transverse series of short slender black threads. Antenna, head, thorax and abdomen as in the male.

Taxonomy
The butterfly was earlier known as Gerydus symethus (Cramer).

Subspecies

 M. s. symethus (Java)
 M. s. acampsis (Fruhstorfer, 1913) (northern Sumatra)
 M. s. atimonicus Murayama & Okamura, 1973
 M. s. batuensis (Fruhstorfer, 1914) (Batu Islands)
 M. s. edonus (Fruhstorfer, 1913) (Philippines: Palawan)
 M. s. hierophantes (Fruhstorfer, 1915) (northern Borneo, Sulu Islands)
 M. s. nuctus Eliot, 1961 (Sumatra)
 M. s. perlucidus (Fruhstorfer, 1913) (Bali, Lombok, eastern Java)
 M. s. petronius (Distant & Pryer, 1887) (Burma, Thailand, Langkawi, Malay Peninsula, Singapore, Borneo, Bangka, Natuna, Belitung, Karimata)
 M. s. phantus Eliot, 1986 (Philippines: Marinduque, Luzon)
 M. s. philopator (Fruhstorfer, 1914) (Philippines)
 M. s. solitarius Okubo, 1983 (Tioman)
 M. s. vespasianus (Fruhstorfer, 1913) (Nias)

Cited references

See also
Lycaenidae
List of butterflies of India
List of butterflies of India (Lycaenidae)

References

Print

External links
 With images.

symethus
Butterflies of Asia
Butterflies described in 1777
Butterflies of Singapore
Butterflies of Borneo
Taxa named by Pieter Cramer